Gray Rock is an isolated rock lying  east-northeast of Rhodes Head, at the southeast side of the Eisenhower Range in Victoria Land, Antarctica. It was mapped by the United States Geological Survey from surveys and U.S. Navy air photos, 1955–63, and was named by the Advisory Committee on Antarctic Names for Alvin M. Gray, a radioscience researcher at McMurdo Station, summer 1965–66.

References

Rock formations of Victoria Land
Scott Coast